The Witch's Dungeon Classic Movie Museum in Plainville, Connecticut, USA, is a collection of figures of classic movie monsters. 

The museum is owned by the Bristol-native Cortlandt Hull. Cortlandt is the great nephew of film actor Henry Hull. Josephine Hull, well known for her role in the classic film and stage play Arsenic and Old Lace, is also a relative. In 1966, Cortlandt's father helped him build the Swiss chalet-style building to house the museum. Cortlandt built life-size figures of classic movie monsters that were made of wax, fine wire mesh, papier-mache and polymers. The figures were later replaced with more accurate ones. 

The museum is open year round, weekend evenings. The new location for "The Witch's Dungeon Classic Movie Museum" is 103 East Main St in Plainville , CT 06062. The greatly expanded format allows for each figure to have its own backdrop and props. Additionally the museum features professional level lighting by Emmy award winning Bill Diamond. 

The heads of many of the figurines have been based on life-casts of the actual actors who portrayed them. Background sets and clothing are authentic to the era, with some costumes or props actually used in the original films. Characters represented in the museum are:
 Frankenstein's Monster (portrayed by Boris Karloff)
 Erik, The Phantom Of The Opera (portrayed by Lon Chaney Sr.)
 Zenobia, The Gypsy Witch (an original character voiced by June Foray)
 The Abominable Dr. Phibes (portrayed by Vincent Price)
 The Creature from the Black Lagoon (portrayed by Ricou Browning)
 Count Dracula (portrayed by Béla Lugosi)
 The Mole People
 Kharis, The Mummy (portrayed by Lon Chaney Jr.)
 Professor Henry Jarrod (scarred and unscarred versions), from House Of Wax (portrayed by Vincent Price) (one wears the original suit worn by Vincent Price in the film)
 The Fly (portrayed by David (Al) Hedison)
 Nosferatu, Count Orlok (portrayed by Max Schreck)
 The Masque of the Red Death, from The Phantom of the Opera (portrayed by Lon Chaney Sr.)
 Dr. Niemann (with Dracula's skeleton), from House of Frankenstein (portrayed by Boris Karloff)
 The Beast from La Belle et la Bête (portrayed by Jean Marais)
 Maleficent, from Disney's Sleeping Beauty
 Dr. Wilfred Glendon, The Werewolf of London (portrayed by Henry Hull)

See also 
 Universal Horror
 Universal Monsters

References

External links 
 The Witch's Dungeon Classic Movie Museum (official website)

Museums established in 1966
Museums in Connecticut
Cinema museums in Connecticut